The men's K-4 1000 metres event was a fours kayaking event conducted as part of the Canoeing at the 1992 Summer Olympics program. The official report did not make clear on the two semifinals and final which events were the men's K-2 1000 m event and the men's K-4 1000 m event and would thus create confusion to the average reader.

Medalists

Results

Heats
18 crews entered in three heats. These heats were used to seed the two semifinal events.

Semifinals
The top four finishers in the each semifinal and the fastest fifth-place finisher advanced to the final.

Final
The final was held on August 8.

Germany upset Hungary, the defending Olympic champions and winner of every world championship in the event since 1986, despite losing a key member, Detlef Hofmann, to doping for testosterone two months prior to the 1992 games (Hoffmann would win gold in this event four years later in Atlanta.).

References
1992 Summer Olympics official report Volume 5. pp. 140–1. 
Sports-reference.com 1992 K-4 1000 m results.
Wallechinsky, David and Jaime Loucky (2008). "Canoeing: Men's Kayak Fours 1000 Meters". In The Complete Book of the Olympics: 2008 Edition. London: Aurum Press Limited. pp. 477–8.

Men's K-4 1000
Men's events at the 1992 Summer Olympics